The Department of Municipalities and Housing was a part of the Government of New Brunswick.  It was charged with the planning and supervision of local government and the development and administration of programs in support of affordable housing and home ownership in New Brunswick. This department took over the functions of the former Department of Municipalities, Culture and Housing in 1998. In 2000, the department's functions were transferred to the new departments of Environment and Local Government and Family and Community Services.

Ministers

References 
 List of ministers and deputy ministers by department, New Brunswick Legislative Library  (pdf)

Defunct New Brunswick government departments and agencies